Eric Kelechi Igwe is a Nigerian lawyer and politician who is serving as the deputy governor of Ebonyi State .

On March 8, 2022, Igwe and his governor Dave Umahi were sacked as Governor and Deputy Governor of Ebonyi State respectively by the Federal High Court in Abuja for defecting to the All Progressives Congress while in office. The court said that the popular votes given to Umahi belonged to the People's Democratic Party and by defecting from the party the office seizes to be theirs. The court immediately ordered the PDP to submit the name of their gubernatorial candidate to INEC or for a fresh gubernatorial election to be conducted in Ebonyi State.

References

Nigerian politicians
Living people
Year of birth missing (living people)
Place of birth missing (living people)